Loparite-(Ce) is a granular, brittle oxide mineral of the perovskite class. It is black to dark grey and may appear grey to white in reflected light on polished thin section with reddish brown internal reflections. Nioboloparite is a variation of Loparite-(Ce) containing niobium.

Loparite occurs as a primary phase in nepheline syenite intrusions and pegmatites. It is also found replacing perovskite in carbonatites.

Loparite was first described for an occurrence in the Khibiny and Lovozero massifs, Kola peninsula in northern Russia.

Etymology
The term originates from the word Lopar, the (former) Russian name for the Sami indigenous inhabitants of the Kola peninsula, and the cerium content.

References

External links

Mindat.org
Webmineral

Oxide minerals
Sámi